M/V Destiny is a fireboat operated by the Tacoma Fire Department (TFD) in Tacoma, Washington.

The 30-foot craft is a FireStorm 30 design manufactured by Canadian boat builder MetalCraft Marine. It entered service in 2012. Destiny cost $675,000 to build and outfit, with funding coming from the United States, the City of Tacoma, and the Port of Tacoma. Classified by the TFD as a rapid response boat, principal firefighting gear is a 1,800 gallon-per-minute pump.

References

2007 ships
Seattle
Fireboats of Puget Sound